Zünheboto Sümi Baptist Church is a Baptist church located in Zünheboto, Nagaland, India. It is affiliated with the Nagaland Baptist Church Council. The church is considered to be one of the largest church buildings in Asia. The attendance is 8,500 people.

History 

The church is founded in 1942. .The church building construction began on 5 May 2007 and more than 2000 workers were issued inner line permits to participate in the construction works. It took 10 years to build and was built at a reported cost of 36 crores. The church was dedicated by Rev. Dr. Solomon Rongpi, General Secretary of the Council of Baptist Churches in Northeast India on 22 April 2017. In 2017, the church had an attendance of 10,000 people.

Dimensions 
The church measures 23,73,476 Sq.ft in plinth area and has a blue dome and white turrets. The church is 203 feet in length, 153 feet in breadth and 166 feet in height. The church can seat 8500 people and also has 27 rooms for different purposes. The bell of the church was imported from Poland and costs Rupees 15 lakh. The 500 kg bell is made of 93% brass and 7% tin and has a 1.5 km radial sound outreach.

See also
List of the largest evangelical churches
List of the largest evangelical church auditoriums
Worship service (evangelicalism)

References

Evangelical megachurches in India
Baptist churches in India
Christianity in Nagaland
Zünheboto
Churches in Nagaland
1942 establishments in India
Churches completed in 2017
21st-century churches in India
21st-century Baptist churches